The Riegel Covered Bridge No. 6 (also known as Reuben Reigel's Covered Bridge) was an historic wooden covered bridge located in Franklin Township in Columbia County, Pennsylvania. It crossed Roaring Creek. It was one of 28 historic covered bridges in Columbia and Montour Counties identified in the late-1970s.

It was listed on the National Register of Historic Places in 1979. The bridge was destroyed in an arson fire on May 30, 1979.

References 

Covered bridges on the National Register of Historic Places in Pennsylvania
Covered bridges in Columbia County, Pennsylvania
Bridges completed in 1870
Wooden bridges in Pennsylvania
Bridges in Columbia County, Pennsylvania
National Register of Historic Places in Columbia County, Pennsylvania
Road bridges on the National Register of Historic Places in Pennsylvania
Burr Truss bridges in the United States
Covered bridges in the United States destroyed by arson
1870 establishments in Pennsylvania
1979 disestablishments in Pennsylvania